Thayne is a town in Lincoln County, Wyoming, United States. The population was 366 at the 2010 census.

Geography
Thayne is located at  (42.919754, –111.000714), at 5906 feet in elevation. It sits in the northern portion of Wyoming's grassy Star Valley, close to the Salt River. Thayne is surrounded by green grassland and ranches, with forested mountains at the valley's edge.

Demographics

2010 census
As of the census of 2010, there were 366 people, 144 households, and 90 families living in the town. The racial makeup of the town was 91.5% White, 1.1% Asian, 6.0% from other races, and 1.4% from two or more races. Hispanic or Latino of any race were 9.3% of the population.

There were 144 households, of which 35.4% had children under the age of 18 living with them, 49.3% were married couples living together, 9.0% had a female householder with no husband present, 4.2% had a male householder with no wife present, and 37.5% were non-families. 31.9% of all households were made up of individuals, and 11.2% had someone living alone who was 65 years of age or older. The average household size was 2.54 and the average family size was 3.22.

The median age in the town was 35.6 years. 27.6% of residents were under the age of 18; 8.1% were between the ages of 18 and 24; 24.6% were from 25 to 44; 28.7% were from 45 to 64; and 10.9% were 65 years of age or older. The gender makeup of the town was 53.0% male and 47.0% female.

2000 census
As of the census of 2000, there were 341 people, 118 households, and 86 families living in the town. The population density was 467.4 people per square mile (180.4/km2). There were 135 housing units at an average density of 185.0 per square mile (71.4/km2). The racial makeup of the town was 97.65% White, 0.29% Native American, 0.29% from other races, and 1.76% from two or more races. Hispanic or Latino of any race were 0.59% of the population.

There were 118 households, out of which 48.3% had children under the age of 18 living with them, 60.2% were married couples living together, 10.2% had a female householder with no husband present, and 26.3% were non-families. 19.5% of all households were made up of individuals, and 6.8% had someone living alone who was 65 years of age or older. The average household size was 2.89 and the average family size was 3.31.

In the town, the population was spread out, with 35.8% under the age of 18, 12.0% from 18 to 24, 25.8% from 25 to 44, 16.4% from 45 to 64, and 10.0% who were 65 years of age or older. The median age was 26 years. For every 100 females, there were 99.4 males. For every 100 females age 18 and over, there were 99.1 males.

The median income for a household in the town was $31,875, and the median income for a family was $30,250. Males had a median income of $31,406 versus $15,375 for females. The per capita income for the town was $10,248. About 24.7% of families and 27.4% of the population were below the poverty line, including 24.6% of those under age 18 and 26.5% of those age 65 or over.

Education
Public education in the town of Thayne is provided by Lincoln County School District #2.

Thayne has a public library, a branch of the Lincoln County Library System.

References

External links
Town of Thayne, Wyoming
Thayne Elementary School

Towns in Lincoln County, Wyoming
Towns in Wyoming